The Frank L. and Mabel H. Dean House is an historic house at 10 Cedar Street in Worcester, Massachusetts.  Built in 1901 for a prominent lawyer and politician, it is a well-preserved example of period Colonial Revival architecture, with rare period handpainted wall murals.  The house was listed on the National Register of Historic Places in 2002.

Description and history
The Dean House stands in a formerly residential area a short way northwest of downtown Worcester, at the northwest corner of Linden and Cedar Streets.  It is generally surrounded by parking lots.  It is a -story wood-frame structure, with a hip roof and clapboarded exterior.  It is three bays wide and four deep, with a rear ell that is one bay wide and one bay deep. A two-bay, two-story pavilion projects from the east side of the main body of the house.  The house is topped by a high hipped roof with embedded gable dormers; the edges of the roof are flared in a graceful curve.  The eaves and raking sections of the roof are trimmed with modillion brackets, below which are a band of dentil molding and a narrow frieze.  The interior of the house is elaborately trimmed in wood, and many of the downstairs rooms are decorated with wall murals.

The house was built in 1901 for Frank L. Dean, a prominent lawyer and Republican politician.  The house was built next door to a fine Second Empire house (now demolished), and not far from the childhood home of Dean's wife, Mabel Houghton.  Frank Dean served one term as mayor of Worcester in 1903, and then as the personal secretary to Governos Curtis Guild Jr. and Eben Draper.  Mabel Houghton Dean was a member of the Worcester Women's Club, an exclusive social and philanthropic organization.  Their house is a good example of a generously scaled American Foursquare with Colonial Revival features.

See also
National Register of Historic Places listings in northwestern Worcester, Massachusetts
National Register of Historic Places listings in Worcester County, Massachusetts

References

Colonial Revival architecture in Massachusetts
Houses completed in 1901
Houses in Worcester, Massachusetts
Houses on the National Register of Historic Places in Worcester County, Massachusetts
National Register of Historic Places in Worcester, Massachusetts